Thomas George Davies, better known online as GeoWizard, is a British YouTuber and adventurer known for his skill in playing the internet geography game GeoGuessr and his "straight line mission" adventures.

Career
Growing up in Aldridge, West Midlands, Davies held a number of jobs before becoming successful on YouTube, including roles as a fishmonger, van driver, and bartender.

Davies is known for his skill at GeoGuessr, a browser game in which the player must identify locations in Google Street View.

He is also known for his "straight line missions", in which he uses a GPS device and attempts to cross countries in a straight line. In 2019, Davies' first attempt was to cross Wales, but a mix of bad weather and steeper terrain than expected resulted in failure  from the coast. In 2020, during the start of the COVID-19 pandemic in the United Kingdom, he attempted to cross Wales again, this time with his childhood friend Greg, but the effort was halted roughly midway for health reasons. Later in 2020, Davies successfully crossed Norway. In early 2021, Davies and Greg attempted to cross Scotland but failed when they were caught by police for breaking COVID-19 guidelines. In October 2021, Davies and his brother Ben attempted to cross Wales for a third time. The pair managed to complete the crossing, but a GPS battery malfunction on day three caused them to temporarily leave the line, making it non-continuous.

In August 2022, Davies and a small support crew dribbled a football across the width of Britain along Hadrian's Wall Path in a continuous run. Starting on the west coast, they walked and jogged the  route in approximately 23 hours, stopping only for brief periods for food and water. Davies was the only member of the team to touch the football, making no hand contact with it at any point and becoming the first person to achieve this feat. The event was recorded and named Dribbling Britain, and raised £70,000 for charities supporting homelessness, men's mental health, and youth violence.

Davies is also known for his series How Not to Travel, in which he and his childhood friend Greg travel in the most bizarre and unique ways possible. Hitchhiking, biking, and even using scooters are a few of the ways they have travelled in the series.

Davies registered his YouTube channel, "GeoWizard", on 15 May 2015. As of December 2022, Davies has amassed over 1,160,000 subscribers and over 165 million views across all his public videos. Davies composes music and his most recent album, 16-Bit Adventure, is used as the underscore to his videos.

References

External links
 
 
 GeoWizard's channel on Twitch
 "16-Bit Adventure" on Spotify

British YouTubers
Walkers of the United Kingdom
People from Aldridge
Living people
YouTube channels launched in 2015
Year of birth missing (living people)
GeoGuessr players